Ali Karakaya (born 1 January 2002) is a Turkish football player who plays as a midfielder for 1922 Konyaspor in the TFF Third League on loan from Konyaspor.

Professional career
Karakaya signed his first professional contract with Konyaspor on 25 April 2019. Karakaya made his professional debut with Konyaspor in a 2–1 Turkish Cup win over Gaziantep on 13 January 2021.

References

External links
 
 

2002 births
People from Isparta
Living people
Turkish footballers
Turkey youth international footballers
Association football midfielders
Konyaspor footballers
1922 Konyaspor footballers
TFF Second League players
TFF Third League players